David Cameron Lee (born March 8, 1982) is an American volleyball player, currently working as the head coach for Indian Club, Bengaluru Torpedoes. As a member of the United States men's national volleyball team, he is an Olympic Champion at the 2008 Summer Olympics, an Olympic bronze medalist at the 2016 Summer Olympics, and a three-time Olympian (2008, 2012, 2016). He is also a two-time NORCECA Champion (2007, 2013), a gold medalist at the 2015 World Cup, and a gold medalist of the World League (2008, 2014).

Early life
Lee was born in Alpine, California. He attended Granite Hills High School in El Cajon, California, where he graduated in 2000.

College
As a junior at Long Beach State in 2003, he was named to the All-Mountain Pacific Sports Federation (MPSF) second team and led the conference with a .483 hitting percentage. As a senior in 2004, he was named an American Volleyball Coaches Association (AVCA) First Team All-American. He helped Long Beach State to the 2004 NCAA championship match, where they lost to BYU in the longest championship match in NCAA men's volleyball history. Long Beach State held two championship points, but did not convert and lost 3-2, 19-17 in the fifth game.

International

Professional
Lee has played professionally in Greece, Russia, Italy, France, Puerto Rico, Portugal and Indonesia. He has won national championships in Indonesia and Greece.

For the 2015-16 season, he was playing for P.A.O.K. V.C. in Thessaloniki Greece.

U.S. national team
Lee joined the U.S. national team in 2005. He became a part-time starter in 2007, splitting time with Tom Hoff and finishing the season second on the team in blocks. Lee was the team's second-leading blocker and third overall at the 2007 World Cup, where the U.S. finished fourth.

Olympics
Lee made his Olympic debut with the U.S. national team in 2008 in Beijing, China, helping Team USA win the gold medal. He competed at the 2012 Summer Olympics in London and finished in 5th place with the U.S. team. He went on to compete at his third Olympics in 2016 in Rio, and won the bronze medal with his U.S. teammates.

Awards

Clubs
 2011-12 CEV Men's Cup –  Champion, with Dynamo Moscow
2015-16 Greek Volleyball League -  Champion, with P.A.O.K. V.C.
2017-18 Liga de Voleibol Argentina –  Champion, with UPCN Vóley

National team

Senior team
 2005 America's Cup,  Gold medal
 2005 NORCECA Championship,  Gold medal
 2007 FIVB World League,  Bronze medal
 2007 NORCECA Championship,  Gold medal
 2008 FIVB World League,  Gold medal
 2008 Summer Olympics,  Gold medal
 2009 NORCECA Championship,  Silver medal
 2011 NORCECA Championship,  Silver medal
 2013 NORCECA Championship,  Gold medal
 2015  FIVB World League
 2015  FIVB World Cup
 2016'  Olympic Games

Individual
 2011 NORCECA Volleyball Championship "Best Blocker" 2014 World League "Best Middle Blocker"''

References

External links

1982 births
Living people
American men's volleyball players
Olympic gold medalists for the United States in volleyball
Volleyball players at the 2008 Summer Olympics
Long Beach State Beach men's volleyball players
Sportspeople from El Cajon, California
Volleyball players at the 2007 Pan American Games
Volleyball players at the 2012 Summer Olympics
Volleyball players at the 2016 Summer Olympics
Halkbank volleyball players
Modena Volley players
PAOK V.C. players
Medalists at the 2008 Summer Olympics
Pan American Games silver medalists for the United States
Medalists at the 2016 Summer Olympics
Olympic bronze medalists for the United States in volleyball
American expatriate sportspeople in China
American expatriate sportspeople in France
American expatriate sportspeople in Greece
American expatriate sportspeople in Italy
American expatriate sportspeople in Russia
American expatriate sportspeople in Turkey
Expatriate volleyball players in China
Expatriate volleyball players in France
Expatriate volleyball players in Greece
Expatriate volleyball players in Italy
Expatriate volleyball players in Russia
Expatriate volleyball players in Turkey
People from Alpine, California
Pan American Games medalists in volleyball
Medalists at the 2007 Pan American Games
Middle blockers